In England, local enterprise partnerships (LEPs) are voluntary partnerships between local authorities and businesses, set up in 2011 by the Department for Business, Innovation and Skills to help determine local economic priorities and lead economic growth and job creation within the local area. They carry out some of the functions previously carried out by the regional development agencies which were abolished in March 2012. In certain areas, funding is received from the UK government via growth deals.

After the March 2017 merger of Northamptonshire LEP into South East Midlands LEP, there were 38 local enterprise partnerships in operation.

History
The abolition of regional development agencies and the creation of local enterprise partnerships were announced as part of the June 2010 United Kingdom budget. On 29 June 2010 a letter was sent from the Department for Communities and Local Government and the Department for Business, Innovation and Skills to local authority and business leaders, inviting proposals to replace regional development agencies in their areas by 6 September 2010. On 7 September 2010, details were released of 56 proposals for local enterprise partnerships that had been received. On 6 October 2010, during the Conservative Party Conference, it was revealed that 22 had been given the provisional 'green light' to proceed and others might later be accepted with amendments. 24 bids were announced as successful on 28 October 2010. 

LEPs were set up on a voluntary basis without any public funding and struggled to make progress.  A report by Michael Heseltine in October 2012, No Stone Unturned, was largely accepted by Government, and proposed delegating certain funds from central government to LEPs. Changes included:
 allocating a share of a £1,400m Local Growth Fund to generate growth, through competitive bidding;
 getting LEPs to draw up plans for local growth as the basis for negotiation on the money in the Fund
 realigning the management of the EU Structural and Investment Funds in England to follow the plans made by LEPs.

City deals
The LEP areas of Greater Birmingham and Solihull, Greater Manchester, Leeds City Region, North Eastern, Sheffield City Region, and West of England were included in the first wave of 'city deals' in 2012.

Growth deals 
Local growth deals, for projects that benefit the local area and economy, began to be made to some LEPs in 2014.

List of LEPs
Local enterprise partnership areas are allowed to overlap, so a local authority is permitted to be part of more than one local enterprise partnership. Currently there are 38 local enterprise partnerships in operation:

See also
 Local government in England
 History of local government in England
 Local strategic partnership
 Local transport bodies
 Combined authority

Notes

References

External links
The LEP Network
Embeddable map of all the LEPs

Economy of England
Local government in England
 
2011 establishments in England
Government agencies established in 2011